Zdzisław Żygulski (4 April 1888 – 22 October 1975) was a Polish literary historian and Germanist. He was a professor at the universities of Łódź and Wrocław. An expert of German literature of 18th–19th century and antique drama, he published, with Marian Szyrocki, a German literature history textbook Geschichte der deutschen Literatur (vol. 1–4; 1958–1965). His notable works includes Gerhart Hauptmann. Człowiek i twórca (1968), Fryderyk Schiller (1975). His son, also named Zdzisław, was an art historian, academic and educator.

References

 

1888 births
1975 deaths
20th-century Polish historians
Polish non-fiction writers
Polish male non-fiction writers
Germanists